Thomas Settle (March 9, 1789 – August 5, 1857) was a Congressional Representative from North Carolina from 1817 to 1821.

Settle was born near Reidsville, North Carolina, March 9, 1789; educated by private tutors; studied law; was admitted to the bar in 1812 and commenced practice in Wentworth, North Carolina.  He was elected to the State House of Commons in 1816; elected as a Republican to the Fifteenth and Sixteenth Congresses (March 4, 1817 – March 3, 1821); declined to be a candidate for reelection in 1820.  Settle resumed the practice of law, was again a member of the State House of Commons, from c. 1826–1829, and served as speaker in the last session.  Later, Settle served as a judge of the superior court of North Carolina from 1832 to 1857.   He died in Rockingham County, North Carolina, August 5, 1857; interment in the Settle family graveyard, near Reidsville, N.C.

His son was also named Thomas Settle (1831–1888), as was his grandson, Thomas Settle III. David Settle Reid was his nephew.

See also 
 Fifteenth United States Congress
 Sixteenth United States Congress

External links
 

Members of the North Carolina House of Representatives
North Carolina state court judges
1789 births
1857 deaths
Democratic-Republican Party members of the United States House of Representatives from North Carolina
People from Reidsville, North Carolina
Settle family
19th-century American politicians
19th-century American judges